Wellington da Silva de Souza (born 27 May 1987), sometimes known as just Souza, is a Brazilian football striker who currently plays for Oeste Futebol Clube. He played for Gyeongnam FC in the South Korea and J2 League side Tokushima Vortis.

References

External links

 

1987 births
Living people
Brazilian footballers
Brazilian expatriate footballers
Marília Atlético Clube players
América Futebol Clube (RN) players
Paraná Clube players
Gyeongnam FC players
Tokushima Vortis players
Oeste Futebol Clube players
Clube do Remo players
K League 1 players
J2 League players
Brazilian expatriate sportspeople in South Korea
Expatriate footballers in Japan
Expatriate footballers in South Korea
Brazilian expatriate sportspeople in Japan
Association football forwards